Jalilabad may refer to:

Azerbaijan
Cəlilabad, Azerbaijan
Jalilabad Rayon, in Azerbaijan

Iran
Jalilabad, Alborz, a village in Nazarabad County, Alborz Province, Iran
Jalilabad, East Azerbaijan, a village in Charuymaq County, East Azerbaijan Province, Iran
Jalilabad, Mamasani, a village in Mamasani County, Fars Province, Iran
Jalilabad, Jiroft, a village in Jiroft County, Kerman Province, Iran
Jalilabad, Sirjan, a village in Sirjan County, Kerman Province, Iran
Jalilabad, Markazi, a village in Farahan County, Markazi Province, Iran
Jalilabad, Mazandaran, a village in Tonekabon County, Mazandaran Province, Iran
Jalilabad, Kalat, a village in Kalat County, Razavi Khorasan Province, Iran
Jalilabad, Rashtkhvar, a village in Rashtkhvar County, Razavi Khorasan Province, Iran
Jalilabad, Torbat-e Jam, a village in Torbat-e Jam County, Razavi Khorasan Province, Iran
Jalilabad, Semnan, a village in Aradan County, Semnan Province, Iran
Jalilabad, Firuzkuh, a village in Firuzkuh County, Tehran Province, Iran
Jalilabad, Pishva, a village in Pishva County, Tehran Province, Iran
Jalilabad District (Iran), in Pishva County, Tehran Province, Iran
Jalilabad Rural District, in Pishva County, Tehran Province, Iran
Jalilabad, Zanjan, a village in Zanjan County, Zanjan Province, Iran
Jalilabad, Ijrud, a village in Ijrud County, Zanjan Province, Iran

See also
Jalalabad (disambiguation)